Wa Mei Shan is a mountain in northeastern Hong Kong on Sai Kung Peninsula. It is located within Tai Po District.

Geography
Wa Mei Shan is 391 metres tall and is one of the taller mountains on Sai Kung Peninsula.

Access
MacLehose Trail Stage 3 passes through the southeastern foot of this hill. There are no roads leading into this area.

See also
 List of mountains, peaks and hills in Hong Kong

References